The 2002 San Diego City Council election occurred on November 5, 2002. The primary election was held on March 5, 2002. Four of the eight seats of the San Diego City Council were contested. Two incumbent council members stood for reelection after having previously been elected to partial terms.

Municipal elections in California are officially non-partisan, although most candidates do identify a party preference. A two-round system was used for the election, starting with a primary in June followed by a runoff in November between the top-two candidates if no candidate received a majority of the votes in the first round.

Three of the council seats filled in this election became vacant prior to the completion of the 2006 term end date. This led to three special elections to choose council members to complete these terms.

Campaign

The 2002 election was the first to use the eight district boundaries created by the 2000 Redistricting Commission. Seats in districts 2, 4, 6, and 8 were up for election.

Donna Frye and Ralph Inzunza both were incumbents serving partial terms after winning special elections to fill the seats vacated by the resignations of Valerie Stallings and Juan Vargas respectively.

Results

District 2 
District 2 consisted of the communities of Bankers Hill/Park West, Downtown San Diego, La Jolla/Mount Soledad, Little Italy, Midway/North Bay, Mission Beach, Mission Hills, Ocean Beach, Old Town, Pacific Beach, and Point Loma. Michael Zucchet and Kevin Faulconer received the most votes in the primary and advanced to the general election. Zucchet was elected to city council with the majority of votes in November.

District 4 
District 4 consisted of the communities of Alta Vista, Broadway Heights, Chollas View, Emerald Hills, Encanto, Jamacha, Lincoln Park, Lomita Village, Mount Hope, Mountain View, North Bay Terrace, Oak Park, O'Farrell, Paradise Hills, Ridgeview, Skyline Hills, South Bay Terrace, Valencia Park, and Webster. Incumbent council member Tony Young, who had previously been elected to a partial term in 2004 after the death of Charles L. Lewis, was reelected with a majority of the votes in the June primary.

District 6 
District 6 consisted of the communities of Bay Ho, Bay Park, Clairemont Mesa, Fashion Valley, Kearny Mesa, Linda Vista, Mission Valley, North Clairemont, and Serra Mesa. Incumbent council member Donna Frye won reelection with a majority of the votes in the June primary.

District 8 
District 8 consisted of the communities of San Diego along the Mexico–United States border, including the communities of Barrio Logan, Egger Highlands, Grant Hill, Golden Hill, Logan Heights, Memorial, Nestor, Ocean View Hills, Otay Mesa West, Otay Mesa East, San Ysidro, Sherman Heights, Southcrest, Stockton, and Tijuana River Valley. Incumbent council member Ben Hueso, who had previously been elected to a partial term in 2005 after the resignation of Ralph Inzunza, was reelected with a majority of the votes in the June primary.

References 

San Diego
2002 California elections
San Diego City Council elections
2000s in San Diego